Robert Huang (born January 4, 2000), better known as Blaber, is an American professional League of Legends player for Cloud9.

Career
Huang, then competing under the name "blaberfish2," was drafted by Cloud9 at the 2017 Scouting Grounds draft. A high school student at the time, Huang told the team that he wanted to finish school before pursuing a career in League of Legends. After graduating in 2018, Huang competed with Cloud9's academy team.

Cloud9 
After performing well with Cloud9's academy team, Huang was substituted into Cloud9's North American League of Legends Championship Series (NA LCS) roster in the 2018 NA LCS Summer Split over starting jungler Dennis "Svenskeren" Johnsen. After being regularly substituted into the NA LCS Cloud9 roster, the team lost only one match, going from last place in the league's standings to potentially receiving a first-round bye into the season playoffs. Throughout the season, Huang took on a sometimes-too-aggressive playstyle that "seemed to galvanize the team ... even when Svenskeren was brought back as the starter." After going  in the matches he played in the Summer Split, he received the league's Rookie of the Split award. In the playoffs, Cloud9 fell to a 1–2 deficit against Team SoloMid in the semifinals; after substituting Huang into the lineup, the team won the final two matches to advance to the finals. In their finals match against Team Liquid, Cloud9 fell to Team Liquid 0–3, with neither of the team's junglers making much of an impact.

Throughout the 2019 LCS season, Huang continued his role as the team's secondary jungler behind Svenskeren. After struggling in their match against Hong Kong Attitude at the 2019 League of Legends World Championship, Cloud9 opted to start Huang in their match against G2 Esports the following day.

In the offseason preceding the 2020 LCS season, Svenskeren left the team, citing that he did not want to split playing time with Huang. Throughout the 2020 Spring Split, Huang led the league amongst all junglers multiple statistical categories, including experience differential, which was higher than all other junglers combined. For his performance throughout the split, Huang received the league's Most Valuable Player of the Split award. Cloud9 also went on to defeat FlyQuest in the Spring Split finals, marking Huang's first championship win.

For the Summer split, Blaber still performed well, taking 1st Team All Pro honors, again proving to be the best jungler in the league. However, in the playoffs, C9 was upset by FlyQuest, and then by TSM in the losers bracket, surprisingly missing Worlds 2020, the first time the Cloud9 organization had ever missed a Worlds.

In the Spring Split of the 2021 LCS season, Huang led the league in kills, assists, total team kill share, and damage, eventually winning his second MVP award. Cloud9 would also defeat Team Liquid in the Mid-Season Showdown, marking Huang's second championship win.

At MSI, Huang struggled against tougher international competition, and with the changes in the meta, not performing up to the high expectations that were placed on him. C9 was eliminated in the "Rumble Stage" of the tournament, placing lower than expected.

References

2000 births
Living people
Cloud9 (esports) players
American esports players
League of Legends jungle players